Lorenzo Cortesia (born 26 July 1999) is an Italian volleyball player who won the 2021 European Championship.

References

External links
 

1999 births
Living people
Italian men's volleyball players
Sportspeople from Verona